Gaillardia spathulata, the western blanketflower, is a species of flowering plant in the sunflower family. It is native to the western United States (Utah, western Colorado, and northwestern Arizona, with an isolated population reported from central Kansas).

Gaillardia spathulata grows in clay sandy washes often in desert regions. Each head has 7-10 yellow ray flowers surrounding 60-100 yellow disc flowers.

References

spathulata
Flora of the Western United States
Plants described in 1877
Taxa named by Asa Gray
Flora without expected TNC conservation status